Zanele Nkomo is a South African Member of Parliament for the African National Congress. She was appointed to Parliament in June 2019 after former minister Bathabile Dlamini had resigned her seat. Nkomo is a member of the Standing Committee on Finance and the Committee on Multi-Party Women's Caucus. She also serves on the ANC's regional executive committee in Ekurhuleni.

References

External links

Living people
Year of birth missing (living people)
Place of birth missing (living people)
People from Gauteng
Members of the National Assembly of South Africa
Women members of the National Assembly of South Africa
African National Congress politicians